Disflex6 is an American hip hop duo formed in 1996, consisting of Lazerus Jackson and Jason the Argonaut. The group was a notable pioneer in the "multiracial world of the San Francisco underground hip hop scene." The group's unique dark, mellow, avant-garde style of hip-hop garnered international appeal in particular, and they built on that through releases on European-based labels.

History
Disflex6 was scheduled to release a space-themed, concept album Robot Dreams but the deal with Lex Records fell through and they were left looking for a new home. The duo released Slow Burn on Twenty Four Seven Records in 2007, and The Loopholes Project on Sunset leagues International in 2008.

Members
 Jason the Argonaut - rapper/producer
 Lazerus Jackson - rapper
 Elon is - producer/engineer

Discography

Albums
 1984 (1996)
 Roadside Attractions (1998)
 Where the Sidewalk Ends (2000)
 Robot Dreams (2005)
 Slow Burn (2007)
 The Loophole Project (2008)
 Odyssey (2013)

EPs
 The Guts EP (2000)

Singles
 "Natural Selection" (2000)
 "Hot Season" (2001)
 "The Cliffs" (2001)
 "Trunk" (2003)
 "Dream Sequence" b/w "Bomb the Factory" (2005)
 "Winnie Cooper" (2013)

Remixes
 Collosus - "You a Grown Man Now (Disflex 6 Remix)" from From the Lab (2006)
 Extra Kool - "I Fly" (Elon & Argonaut Remix) (2012)
 GrandKillaCon - "Driftin Drifter" (Argonaut Remix) (2013)

References

 Piąty studyjny album Disflex6 – Odyssey

External links
 
 

Alternative hip hop groups
American musical duos
Musical groups from California